Stage wash can refer to:

Stage wash (audio), during an amplified concert performance, unwanted sound picked up by the microphones
Stage wash (lighting), general area lighting composed of a single hue, evenly balanced in level across the stage
Stage wash (automobile), a car wash that is performed in stages, usually automated
Stage wash (fabric), a fading or bleaching action followed by a dye rinse, usually refers to denim jeans